Lhaviyani may have more than one meaning:

Lhaviyani Atoll, an administrative division of the Maldives.
Lhaviyani, the sixth consonant of the Thaana abugaida used in Dhivehi.